Anelio Bocci (Sarnano 7 August 1953) is a retired male long-distance runner from Italy.

He finished second in the 1981 edition of the Tokyo International Marathon, clocking a total time of 2:12:11, he has 4 caps in national team from 1976 to 1981.

References

1953 births
Living people
Italian male long-distance runners
Italian male marathon runners
Sportspeople from the Province of Macerata